Briercrest South Airport  is located  south-southwest of Briercrest, Saskatchewan, Canada.

See also
List of airports in Saskatchewan

References

External links
Page about this aerodrome on COPA's Places to Fly airport directory

Registered aerodromes in Saskatchewan
Baildon No. 131, Saskatchewan